, also called Mt. Fuji Shizuoka Airport, is located in Shizuoka Prefecture, Japan. Opened on June 4, 2009, the airport has domestic service to Sapporo, Fukuoka, Naha (Okinawa), Komatsu, Kumamoto, and Kagoshima. International routes connect it to Ningbo, Seoul, Taipei, and Shanghai.

The airport is located in Makinohara and Shimada.

History
To allow for growth in air travel to Shizuoka, Hamamatsu, and the Mount Fuji area, and to fill the gap between Tokyo and Nagoya airports, Shizuoka Prefecture bought  of land for Shizuoka Airport. One reason for building this airport in this particular location is that locals and tourists will not have to rely on the severely congested airports of the Tokyo region. Any flights that bypass the Tokyo region will help overall air traffic, including direct international flights. Like Kobe Airport, Shizuoka Airport has come under criticism as Nagoya Airport is not congested and is also in an expansion phase.

Airlines and destinations

Statistics

Access
The closest railway station is Kanaya Station on the Tōkaidō Main Line and the Ōigawa Main Line. It is about 6 km from the airport.
Taxi service to Shizuoka Station, a major station in the area, is available for 8,500 yen.

Route and Highway buses

Bus Stop No. 1 

information

Fuji Dream Airlines Access Bus

Bus Stop No. 3

Bus Stop No. 4 

Free parking for 2,000 cars is available at the airport.

While the Tokaido Shinkansen line travels directly underneath the airport, there is no train station nor have any plans been made to build one.

References

External links

 Mt. Fuji Shizuoka Airport website
 Shizuoka Prefecture Department of Airport – Mt.Fuji Shizuoka Airport 
 Port and Airport Department, Chubu Regional Bureau, MLIT – Shizuoka Airport 
  Tokyo Regional Civil Aviation Bureau, MLIT – Shizuoka Airport 

Airports in Japan
Transport in Shizuoka Prefecture
Airport

Airport
Mount Fuji
Buildings and structures in Shizuoka Prefecture
Airports established in 2009
2009 establishments in Japan
Makinohara, Shizuoka
Shimada, Shizuoka